The Tyne Turrets were two 12-inch Mk VIII guns from the battleship HMS Illustrious, installed in Roberts Battery at Hartley, near Seaton Sluice north of the Tyne, and Kitchener Battery in Marsden near Lizard Point south of the river. The batteries were planned in World War I but only commissioned in 1921, and after a change of heart scrapped in 1926. This very heavy armament was only rivalled by the Dover harbour Admiralty Pier Turret at the time.

References
 Hogg, R., "The Tyne Turrets:coastal defence in the First World War", Fort (Fortress Study Group), (12), 1984, pp. 97–104
 National Archives, Kew. Plans for Kitchener/Roberts Batteries  WO 78.4973 and WO 78.4974

20th-century forts in England
Buildings and structures in Northumberland
Coastal artillery